The 2011–12 Coupe de France was the 95th season of France's most prestigious cup competition. The competition was organized by the French Football Federation (FFF) and open to all clubs in French football, including clubs from the overseas departments and territories (Guadeloupe, French Guiana, Martinique, Mayotte, New Caledonia, French Polynesia, and Réunion). The final was contested on 28 April 2012 at the Stade de France. The defending champions were Lille, who defeated Paris Saint-Germain 1–0 in the final of the 2010–11 season. The winner of the competition qualified for the group stage of the 2012–13 UEFA Europa League.

On 28 April 2012, first division club Lyon defeated semi-professional third-tier Quevilly 1–0 in the 2012 Coupe de France Final courtesy of a first half goal from Lisandro López to win its fifth Coupe de France title. The title is the club's first domestically since winning the same competition in 2008. The runners-up, Quevilly, alongside fellow National club Gazélec Ajaccio, were awarded the Petit Poucet Plaque, an award given to the best performing non-professional club in the Coupe de France.

Calendar 

On 17 June 2011, the FFF announced the calendar for the 95th Coupe de France season.

News

Coupe de France final date change 

In February 2011, it was reported by the French media that the French Football Federation had scheduled the 2011–12 edition of the Coupe de France final to be played on 5 May 2012. The date is significant because it would mark the 20th anniversary of the Furiani disaster, which occurred when a tribune at the Stade Armand Cesari in Furiani collapse during a Coupe de France semi-final match between SC Bastia and Marseille. The tragedy resulted in the death of 18 individuals and injuries to over 2,000. The resulting outcry and criticism of the decision to schedule the final on that date led to the Federation issuing a statement declaring that the official calendar for the competition had not been released, so the reports were only rumors. On 31 March 2011, the schedule was released and the date for the final was set for 28 April 2012.

Tourcoing and Viry-Châtillon ruling 

In the 2010–11 Coupe de France, a seventh round match between Tourcoing and Viry-Châtillon was abandoned after 30 minutes following an altercation between two opposing players, which resulted in a brawl breaking out and dozens of spectators invading the field of play. The brawl led to a player losing consciousness and an assistant referee suffering a back injury after being hit with debris. The incident required police and firefighter intervention and, despite handing out four red cards as a result of the altercation, the referee called the match off after repeated failed attempts to restore calm. On 3 December 2010, the French Football Federation ruled that, due to the incidents that occurred in the match, both clubs would be disbarred from this year's competition, effective immediately. Both clubs will also be ineligible to appear in the 2011–12 competition, as well.

Regional qualifying rounds 

All of the teams that enter the competition, but are not members of Ligue 1 or Ligue 2, have to compete in the regional qualifying rounds. The regional qualifying rounds determine the number of regional clubs that will earn spots in the 7th round and normally lasts six rounds.

Seventh Round 

The draw for the seventh round of the Coupe de France was held on 3 November 2011 at the headquarters of the Comité National Olympique et Sportif Français (CNOSF), the national sporting committee of France, and was conducted by former French internationals Grégory Coupet, Willy Sagnol, Olivier Dacourt, and Xavier Gravelaine as well as current French women's international Élise Bussaglia. The overseas regional draw was held the previous day on 2 November at the headquarters of the French Football Federation. The matches were played on 18–20 November.

Overseas region

Eighth Round 

The draw for the eighth round of the Coupe de France was held on 23 November 2011 at the headquarters of the French Football Federation (FFF), and was conducted by former French internationals Luis Fernández and Laurent Robert. The round featured the 88 winners of the seventh round. The matches was played through 9–12 December.

Round of 64 

The draw for the Round of 64 of the Coupe de France was held on 12 December 2011 at the headquarters of Crédit Agricole, a main sponsor of the competition, in Amiens. The round featured the 44 winners of the eighth round, as well as the 20 clubs who play in Ligue 1. The matches was played through 6–9 January 2012.

Following the announcement of the draw, several amateur clubs who were hosting high-profile matches against Ligue 1 clubs announced that they would be re-locating their matches to more suitable venues. After initially scheduling its match against Montpellier to be played at the Stade Louis Dugauguez in Sedan, on 15 December, Prix-lès-Mézières confirmed that the two clubs had agreed to play the match at the Stade du Petit-Bois in nearby Charleville-Mézières. On the same day, it was announced that the Red Star Saint-Ouen–Marseille match would be played at the Stade de France, while the Saint-Colomban Locminé–Paris Saint-Germain match would be played at Stade du Moustoir in Lorient. In the former match, the country's national stadium was reconfigured to accommodate 45,000 individuals.

Round of 32 
The draw for the Round of 32 of the Coupe de France was held on 8 January 2012 at the headquarters of Eurosport. The round featured the 32 winners of the Round of 64. The draw was conducted by current French women's international Gaëtane Thiney and former tennis player Amélie Mauresmo. The matches were played through 21–23 January 2012.

Similar to the previous round, following the draw, several amateur clubs announced that they would be hosting their matches at larger venues. On 11 January, Vendée Luçon officials announced that the club's match against Lyon would be contested at the Stade de la Beaujoire in nearby Nantes. Hours later, it was confirmed that the match between Sablé-sur-Sarthe and Paris Saint-Germain would be played at the MMArena in Le Mans.

Round of 16 

The draw for the Round of 16 of the Coupe de France was held on 22 January 2012 at the headquarters of Eurosport. The round featured the 16 winners of the Round of 32. The draw was conducted by current French international Hatem Ben Arfa and former French rugby union international player Xavier Garbajosa. The matches will be played through 7–8 February 2012.

On 6 February, the French Football Federation announced that three matches would be rescheduled due to inclement weather. The Dijon–Paris Saint-Germain and Bourg-Péronnas–Marseille match was rescheduled for 15 February, while the Quevilly–Orléans will be played on 21 February.

Quarter-finals 

The draw for the quarter-finals of the Coupe de France was held on 19 February 2012 during a television broadcast of Stade 2. The draw was conducted by French rugby union international player Julien Malzieu. The matches were contested on 20–21 March 2012.

Semi-finals 
The draw for the semi-finals of the Coupe de France was held on 21 March 2012. The draw was conducted by figure skater Philippe Candeloro. The matches were contested on 10–11 April 2012.

Final

Media coverage
For the fourth consecutive season in France, France Télévisions were the free to air broadcasters while Eurosport were the subscription broadcasters.

These matches were broadcast live on French television:

References

External links 

 Official site

2011–12 domestic association football cups
2011–12 in French football
2011-12